Lyubomir Andreychin (22 March 1910, in Gabrovo – 3 September 1975, in Sofia) was a Bulgarian linguist.  Correspondent Member of the Bulgarian Academy of Sciences since 1951.  His principal field of scientific research included the grammar and stylistics of modern Bulgarian.

References
Lyubomir Andreychin Biographical data and publications, in the Slavica Library website (in Bulgarian)

1910 births
1975 deaths
People from Gabrovo
Linguists from Bulgaria
Corresponding Members of the Bulgarian Academy of Sciences
20th-century linguists